John Connell (25 June 1940 – September 27, 2009) was an American artist. His works included sculpture, painting, drawing, and writing.

Life and work
Connell was born in Atlanta, Georgia. He attended Brown University, in Providence, RI (1958–1960), the Art Students League, NY (1960–1961) and New York University (1962) where he studied Chinese print making. His first show was in New York in 1962.

In the mid-1960s, he moved to California, where he worked as the set designer for the San Francisco Mime Troupe. In the 1970s, 1980s and 1990s, he worked primarily in the Southwestern United States, where he painted large murals and was visible in New Mexico's most respected art galleries, being part of the Santa Fe artist group Nerve and gaining a reputation for his large installations. He is particularly well known for his drawings, some of which are done in charcoal and spray paint and can be as large as twenty feet high and thirty feet wide.

Connell used plaster-of-Paris in the 1980s, and later turned to tar, paper and wax, in large figurative sculptures. He also used bronze, cement, wood, and chicken wire. His works on paper sometimes include elements of collage. In the early 1980s, he mostly gave up using commercial paints and began making his own out of iron oxide and pigments. In later paintings, he used ashes, mud and earth. His work has also included elements of writing and occasionally audio tape.

Connell's influences included Hokusai, Rembrandt, Balzac, Dante, Giacometti and De Kooning. Buddhism is a central theme, and he cited wabi as his aesthetic.

Death
Connell died onSeptember 27, 2009 in Mariaville, Maine.

Projects
Some of his better-known projects include:
The Construction of Kuan-Yin Lake (1982–1989): A multimedia project that included sculpture, painting, writing and audio and was partially funded by the National Endowment for the Arts.
The Raft Project (1989–1994) : A giant sculpture/painting project with painter Eugene Newmann. It was commonly perceived as being a takeoff on Géricault's The Raft of the Medusa.

Public collections holding his work

Albright-Knox Art Gallery, Buffalo, New York
Albuquerque Museum, Albuquerque, New Mexico
Amon Carter Museum, Fort Worth, Texas
Arkansas Art Center, Little Rock, Arkansas
Bates College Museum of Art, Lewiston, Maine
Blanton Museum of Art, Austin, Texas
The Harwood Museum of Art, Taos, New Mexico
The Hess Collection, Napa Valley, California
Manetti Shrem Museum of Art, Davis, California
Metropolitan Museum of Art, New York
Mobile Museum of Art, Mobile, Alabama
New Mexico Museum of Art, Santa Fe, New Mexico 
Roswell Museum and Art Center, Roswell, New Mexico
Phoenix Art Museum, Phoenix, Arizona
Scottsdale Center for the Arts, Scottsdale, Arizona
University of Arizona Art Museum, Tucson, Arizona
University Art Museum, Albuquerque, New Mexico

References

External links
Artist's website

1940 births
Artists from Santa Fe, New Mexico
Artists from Maine
Postmodern artists
American muralists
20th-century American sculptors
21st-century American sculptors
American male sculptors
20th-century American painters
American male painters
21st-century American painters
21st-century American male artists
American installation artists
Art Students League of New York alumni
People from Hancock County, Maine
2009 deaths
Artists from Atlanta
New York University alumni
Brown University alumni
20th-century American printmakers
Sculptors from New York (state)
Sculptors from New Mexico
American contemporary painters
20th-century American male artists